Kittredge is an unincorporated community in Carroll County, Illinois, United States. Kittredge is located along a railroad line northeast of Lanark and southwest of Shannon.

References

Unincorporated communities in Carroll County, Illinois
Unincorporated communities in Illinois